Madeleine Alexandrine Brès (born on 26 November 1842 at Bouillarges – 30 November 1921 in Montrouge), born Gebelin, was the first French woman to obtain a medical degree in 1875 after her thesis presentation on the topic of breastfeeding and towards a career focused to pediatric care.

Childhood 
Born Madeleine Alexandrine Gebelin, she told in the Medical Chronicle on 1 April 1895 that her interest in medicine started in her early childhood. She often accompanied her father, a craftsman in Nîmes, who would periodically work at the hospital as part of his profession. In the hospital of Nîmes, one nun took an affection to her and taught her some small procedures, such as the preparation of herbal teas and poultices.

She was twelve when the Gebelin family left for Paris, and just over fifteen when she married Adrien-Stéphane Brès, a tram conductor. Brès was able to pursue higher education thanks to the efforts of Julie-Victoire Daubié, who, in 1861, became the first female baccalaureate in France. However Brès had to first obtain the consent of her husband, as at the time French law judged married women to be the legal responsibility of their husbands.

Education 
In 1866, she presented herself to the Dean of the Faculty of Medicine at the University of Paris, Charles Adolphe Wurtz, and asked him for permission to enroll to study medicine. The dean agreed, but on the condition that she first obtain a degree in Arts and Sciences—a task which she accomplished in three years. By then, she was 26 years old and a mother of three. Brès presented herself to the Dean once again and told him there was now no obstacle to her enrollment in the medical course. She also pointed out that three female foreigners—the American Mary Putnam, the Russian Catherine Gontcharoff and the English Elizabeth Garrett Anderson—were holders of nationally known equivalent degrees.

Dean Würtz took Brès's application to the Minister of Education, Victor Duruy, who approved her admission but preemptively brought the matter to the Council of Ministers. The Empress Eugénie also interceded on her behalf. Brès's husband formally gave his consent to his wife's enrollment to the mayor of the 5th municipal district of Paris, and she became a medical student in 1869 in the service of Professor Broca at Mercy Hospital. Her admission was facilitated by the proclamation of the law which allowed women to work (a.k.a. loi de 19 ventôse) during the XI year of the Empire on the sixth month of the Republican calendar. She was admitted alongside the American Mary Puttnam, the Russian Catherine Gontcharoff and the English Elizabeth Garrett - all holders of equivalent national diplomas and bachelors in Arts and Sciences. 

With the onset of the Franco-Prussian War and the departure of a number of hospital physicians for the front, she was made a temporary intern until July 1871, at Professor Broca's suggestion. Strengthened by this experience, Brès decided to pursue a hospital career and sat the external exams, then the internal. Despite the support of Professor Broca, the director of the hospital's Public Assistance refused her authorization to work at the hospital on 21 December 1871.

Eventually, Brès decided against further pursuit of a hospital job. A widow with three children to support, she decided to become a pediatrician. She prepared her thesis, Of Breasts and Breastfeeding—which covered a wide range of material on the mother/child relationship and infant hygiene—in the laboratory of Professor Würtz and defended it, on 3 June 1875. She received honors on her thesis and became the first French woman to become a Doctor of medicine (though not the first woman to obtain such a doctorate in France, since Anderson had been ahead of her by five years).

Study abroad in Paris 
Her studies are meritory, during her second year in Medical School, in 1869, she is featured amongst those under professor Broca at the Pitié Hospital. During her third year, from September 1870 to July 1871 she worked as an intern (this role performed without the title of "interim intern") in the same service in response to the Franco-Prussian War and the departure of many male doctors from the hospital to the front line. Then during the siege of Paris under the "Commune" she remained faithful and committed to her post showing her sense of devotion and responsibility.

To this regard, the certificates from other physicians and the hospital administration praise to her performance. Professor Broca wrote: "Madame Brès in my opinion, was given the interim intern post. In that quality, during two sieges of Paris and through the month of July 1871, she has done her service with such details that no bombardment to our hospital has been able to interrupt. Her service has always been perfect and her tenure irreprochable."

As she was finishing her fourth year, she inquired to participate in the process to apply for an externship for October 1871. Despite the support of professor Broca, the director of hospitals and of public assistance refused her application for this process on 2 December 1871 under the following circumstance:

"This is not in reference of you personally, I believe I could tell you that your permission for this could be agreed upon. However, the Council has understood that it could not henceforth restrict the questioning and the examinee on a general thesis within its applications and its consequences in future times, the Council has been unable to authorize this innovation that our Administration has decided to support".

Madeleine Brès did not insist further. The access of medical students to the process of application for externship would not become effective until 1882; at that time, Blanche Edwards-Piller (1848-1941) became the first French externship participant away from the hospital. The process of application for internships would not be open to women applicants until 1886, and the first French intern to earn the official title was Marthe Francillon-Lobre(1873-1956) who completed this process in 1900.

Career in medicine 
At the same time she was studying medicine, she spent four years at the Museum of Natural History under Edmond Frémy and three years in the laboratory of Charles Adolphe Wurtz where she prepared a research thesis, which she defended on 3 June 1875. The topic was "From the Bottle and breastfeeding" (fr. De la mamelle et de l'allaitement ) where she showed that the chemical composition of breast milk is modified during the course of breast-feeding to better aid the growth and development of the infant.

She obtained an "extremely well" mention and her thesis became known in France and abroad. She then became the first French Female Medical Doctor, however not the first woman to achieve this in France as the British Elizabeth Garrett Anderson achieved this goal five years before.

As a widow she was responsible for three children. She decides to move within the city of Paris at the Rue Boissy-d'Anglas and to specialize in the relation between mother and child as well as the hygiene of young infants. She was surrounded by a clientele of a rich middle class.

She was made responsible by the Prefect of Paris' Seine sector to teach (through conferences and informal talks) about guidelines to various personnel in maternal schools, crèches and kindergartens through the twenty different administrative sectors of Paris.

In 1885, she started her own nursery at 83 rue Nollet within the Batignolles sector, where she cared for and hosted infants and small children for free through the age of 3. This institution that she financed herself would be visited by Théophile Roussel, and later by Marie-Louise Loubet. The nursery eventually became a municipal nursery, but retained her named because of her services to mothers.

Later in 1891, as part of a mission of the Ministry of Interior, she went to Switzerland to study the organization and functional structure of nurseries and asylums.

She would also lead the journal "Women's and Children's Hygiene" and authored of multiple books in child care and pediatric nursing.

Death 
Prior to her death, the Pennsylvania Medical Journal reported in 1921 that at age 82, Brès was "blind and penniless." She died in poverty in Montrouge.

Works and publications 
 Of Breasts and Breastfeeding (De la mamelle et de l'allaitement) [thesis for the doctorate of medicine, presented and supported on Thursday 3 June 1875]. full text printed by E. Martinet, 1875.
 Artificial Feeding and the Bottle (L'Allaitement artificiel et le biberon), G. Masson (Paris), part 8, page 77. et al., 1877, available on Gallica.
A clinical report on vin Nourry iodotané, E. Fougera & Company (New York), 1893.

Empathy and sensibility 

The image includes a note of Madeleine Brès that is translated as "Dear Sir, the divine properties of the Vin de Mariani have been sung in music, in verse and in prose, but what has not been said enough, what couldn’t be repeated enough is the gracious effort that you make to tone up the weak. In the name of the little underprivileged in my clinic, I renew my feelings of deep gratitude to you.

Best regards, Madeleine Brès"

Tributes 
 Several schools and nurseries (crèches in French) (Bobigny, Fresner, Pas-de-Calais) in France are named for her.
 A wing of the centre of the Hospital of Argenteuil (Val-d'Oise), opened in 2013, is named for her.
 Various streets in Paris, Besançon, Nantes and various other French cities such as Cabestany, Limoux, Perpignan, Poitiers, Lille, Laval have been named after her
 A street in Besançon (near the Saint Vincent clinic) is named for her .
 On 25 November 2019, Google celebrated her 177th birthday with a Google Doodle.

Distinctions 

 Recipient of the "Palme Academique" under the title of officer in 1878.
 "Officier de l'instruction publique" (Officer of Public Instruction / Affaires) in 1887.
Rue Madeleine Brès in Paris.

References 

1842 births
1921 deaths
French pediatricians
Women pediatricians
French women physicians
French public health doctors
People from Gard
19th-century French physicians
19th-century women physicians
Women public health doctors